The Body Keeps the Score: Brain, Mind, and Body in the Healing of Trauma is a 2014 book by Bessel van der Kolk about the effects of psychological trauma, also known as traumatic stress. The book describes van der Kolk's research and experiences,  on how individuals are affected by traumatic stress, and its effects on the mind and body. 

The Body Keeps the Score has been published in 36 languages. As of July 2021 the book had spent more than 141 weeks on the New York Times Bestseller List for Nonfiction, with 27 of those weeks spent in the #1 position.

Overview
In the book, Van der Kolk discusses the effect of trauma and forms of healing including possible eye movement desensitization and reprocessing, yoga, and limbic system therapy.

Reception 
The Body Keeps the Score was well-received, including a starred review from Library Journal. Reviewing the book for New Scientist magazine,  Shaoni Bhattacharya wrote that "[p]acked with science and human stories, the book is an intense read that can get technical. Stay with it, though: van der Kolk has a lot to say, and the struggle and resilience of his patients is very moving."

In 2019, The Body Keeps the Score was ranked second in the science category of The New York Times Best Seller list. As of July 2021, the book had spent more than 141 weeks on the New York Times Bestseller List for Nonfiction, with 27 of those weeks spent in the #1 position.

References 

2014 non-fiction books
Books about mental health
Post-traumatic stress disorder
Viking Press books
Books about trauma